The Aama Odisha Party (AOP) was a state political party of the Indian state of Odisha led by Soumya Ranjan Patnaik. It was founded on 26 November 2013. Aama Odisha Party was allotted pot symbol by the Election Commission of India.

On March 22, 2014 Suparno Satpathy quit the Indian National Congress and joined AOP 

On March 6, 2018 Soumya Ranjan Patnaik merged Aama Odisha Party with Biju Janata Dal and he was nominated by Naveen Patnaik as a BJD MP to Rajya Sabha

References

Political parties in Odisha
Political parties established in 2013
Political parties disestablished in 2018
2013 establishments in Odisha